Paul Joseph Gabriël (11 July 1784 – 31 December 1833) was a Dutch painter and sculptor.

He was born at Amsterdam, where he learned sculpture from his father and Canova, and devoted himself principally to that branch of art; but he at first practised miniature painting, and in his twentieth year proceeded to Paris specially to improve himself therein. In 1820 he was made a member of the Institute at Amsterdam, and director of the Royal Academy there. He died at Amsterdam, aged 49.

References

 

1784 births
1833 deaths
19th-century Dutch painters
Dutch male painters
Dutch sculptors
Dutch male sculptors
Portrait miniaturists
Painters from Amsterdam
19th-century sculptors
Prix de Rome (Netherlands) winners
19th-century Dutch male artists